DJ Sammy At Work (In the Mix) is the first remix album by DJ Sammy.  It was released in 1998.

Track listing
CD 1
Mellow Trax — "Phuture Vibes" (Original Version) 
Pulsedriver — "Something For Your Mind"  
Arrakis — "The Spice" (To Short Cut) 
WestBam — "The Roof Is On Fire"  
Mosquito Headz — "El Ritmo" (DJ Tandu Mix) 
Green Court — "Moonflight" (Original Mix)
Fridge — "Paradise" (Nu Gray Mix)
Binary Finary — "1999" (Kay Cee Remix)
Gian Piero — "Children 2000" (Official Bootleg Mix)
York — "The Awakening" (Extended Mix)
Bacon Popper — "Rejoice In Love" (Aohh! Mix)
Lustral — "Everytime" (Nalin & Kane Mix)
Adrima — "Living On A Fantasy" (DJ Sammy Mix)
K(2) — "Waveshaper"
DJ Sammy feat. Charsima — "In 2 Eternity" (Dop Mix)
Condor — "Sky" (Moon Mix)
                                                                        
CD 2
Salt 'N' Pepa — "Push It (Again)" (DJ Tonka Remix) 
Da Klubb Kings — "Don't Stop" (Klubb Mix) 
Porno D.J. — "The Judgement"
Mac Zimms — "The Saxshop"
Silvio Ecomo — "Uprising"
DJ Antoine — "The Disco Bassline" (Pumpin' Groove Mix)
Rhythm Inc. — "Pumpin' It Up"
Bas Molendyk — "Day And Night"
Nature — "Trumpet Gun"
Rhythm Masters — "Deep In The Jungle"
Eddie Amador — "House Music" (Message Mix)
Dance or Die — "1, 2, 3, 4"
Bedlam — "Da-Force"
Nature — "Blue Ocean"
Invisible Man — "Give A Little Love"
King R — "Great Mountain"
Mac Zimms — "Sound Of Soul"
Primeval — "Run To Me"

External links
DJ Sammy at Discogs

DJ Sammy albums